Escape Cliffs is a place on the northern coast of the Northern Territory of Australia and the site of the fourth of a series of four failed attempts to establish permanent settlement in Australia's Top End.  The previous attempts were at Fort Dundas, Fort Wellington and Port Essington. Escape Cliffs lies on the western coast of the Cape Hotham peninsula, and the eastern shore of Adam Bay, near the mouth and estuary of the Adelaide River.  It lies about 60 km north-east of Darwin and is located in the Cape Hotham sector of the Djukbinj National Park.  There is no road access, though it is sometimes visited by yachts.

History
In 1864, the year after South Australia was granted control over the Northern Territory, the South Australian government decided that settlement of the area was desirable and sent a surveying and settlement expedition under the command of Lieutenant Colonel Boyle Travers Finniss, a former Premier of South Australia.  He had been instructed to establish the settlement at Adam Bay and chose the Escape Cliffs site despite disagreements with other members of his party. It was intended to cover settlement costs through sales of land, much of which had already been presold to speculators and intending settlers even before the expedition reached the site and began their survey work. Finniss believed that the site could produce tropical vegetation and would be suitable for wool-growing and cattle farming.

After a confused start, following an abortive initial move to another site some 65 km up the Adelaide River, the establishment work at Escape Cliffs began. Problems included incursions by the local Marananggu people (which culminated in the spearing of several horses and men, murder of two Aborigines and one settler), and the unsuitability of the land due to tidal flooding and poor drainage in the wet season, exacerbated by personal jealousies, poor leadership and the need for constant vigilance, resulted in ongoing disputes and deteriorating morale.

Following complaints and unfavourable reports to the South Australian government, notably by Dr. Goldsmith, Finniss was recalled in 1865, replaced by his second-in-command Manton. John McKinlay, who was sent by the government to assess the viability of Escape Cliffs or find a better site, in 1865, declared it worthless,
Manton reported there was nothing they could usefully do there but guard their stores. In October 1866 Government ordered a recall of Manton and his men aboard the steamer Eagle, Captain Hill, which left 11 January 1867, transhipped to the Rangatira at Sydney, and arrived in Adelaide 2 February 1867.

Two years later, following a better-organised expedition by George Goyder, settlement began at what is now Darwin.

On 12 January 2000, a parcel of land at Escape Cliffs was listed on the Northern Territory Heritage Register.

See also
 Fort Dundas
 Raffles Bay
 Port Essington

References

History of the Northern Territory
History of South Australia
1864 establishments in Australia
1867 disestablishments
Northern Territory Heritage Register